U.S.-Iran naval incident refers to:
 2008 U.S.–Iranian naval dispute
 2016 U.S.–Iran naval incident